Dale Weldeau Jorgenson (May 7, 1933 – June 8, 2022) was the Samuel W. Morris University Professor at Harvard University, teaching in the department of economics and John F. Kennedy School of Government. He served as chairman of the department of economics from 1994 to 1997.

Awards and memberships
Jorgenson has been honored with membership in the American Philosophical Society (1998), the Royal Swedish Academy of Sciences (1989), the U.S. National Academy of Sciences (1978), and the American Academy of Arts and Sciences (1969). He was elected to Fellowship in the American Association for the Advancement of Science (1982), the American Statistical Association (1965), and the Econometric Society (1964). He was awarded honorary doctorates by the Faculty of Social Sciences at Uppsala University (1991), the University of Oslo (1991), Keio University (2003), the University of Mannheim (2004), the University of Rome (2006), the Stockholm School of Economics (2007), the Chinese University of Hong Kong (2007),  Kansai University (2009), and the University of Valencia (2016).

Jorgenson served as president of the American Economic Association in 2000 and was named a Distinguished Fellow of the association in 2001. He was a founding member of the Board on Science, Technology, and Economic Policy of the National Research Council in 1991 and served as chairman of the board from 1998 to 2006. He also served as chairman of Section 54, Economic Sciences, of the National Academy of Sciences from 2000 to 2003 and was president of the Econometric Society in 1987 and president of the American Economic Association in 2000. He was a vice president of the Society for Economic Measurement (SEM).

Jorgenson received the prestigious John Bates Clark Medal of the American Economic Association in 1971. The medal is awarded annually (biennially at the time Jorgenson received it) to an economist under forty who has made outstanding contributions to the field. According to the citation for the award:

Dale Jorgenson has left his mark with great distinction on pure economic theory (with, for example, his work on the growth of a dual economy); and equally on statistical method (with, for example, his development of estimation methods for rational distributed lags). But he is preeminently a master of the territory between economics and statistics, where both have to be applied to the study of concrete problems. His prolonged exploration of the determinants of investment spending, whatever its ultimate lessons, will certainly long stand as one of the finest examples in the marriage of theory and practice in economics.

He was also an advocate for a carbon tax on greenhouse gas emissions as a means of reducing global warming when he testified before congress in 1997. His research has also been used to advocate for the FairTax, a tax reform proposal in the United States to replace all federal payroll and income taxes (both corporate and personal) with a national retail sales tax and monthly tax rebate to households of citizens and legal resident aliens.  However, Jorgenson supported a tax plan of his own design, which he called Efficient Taxation of Income, described in his book Investment, Vol. 3: Lifting the Burden: Tax Reform, the Cost of Capital, and U.S. Economic Growth.  The approach would introduce different tax rates for property-type income and earned income from work.

Research
Jorgenson's 1963 paper, “Capital Theory and Investment Behavior,” introduced all the important features of the cost of capital employed in the subsequent literature. His principal innovations were the derivation of investment demand from a model of capital as a factor of production, the incorporation of the tax treatment of income from capital into the price of capital input, and econometric modeling of gestation lags in the investment process. In 1971 Jorgenson surveyed empirical research on investment in the Journal of Economic Literature. In the same year he was awarded the John Bates Clark Medal of the American Economic Association for his research on investment behavior. In 2011 Jorgenson's paper was chosen as one of the Top 20 papers published in the first 100 years of the American Economic Review.

The predominant role of investment. In 2005 Jorgenson traced the American growth resurgence to its sources in individual industries in his book, Information Technology and the American Growth Resurgence, co-authored with Mun S. Ho and Kevin J. Stiroh. This book employed the framework originated by Jorgenson, Frank M. Gollop, and Barbara M. Fraumeni, but added detailed information about investments in information technology equipment and software. Jorgenson and his co-authors demonstrated that input growth, due to investments in human and non-human capital, was the source of more than 80 percent of U.S. economic growth over the past half century, while growth in total factor productivity accounted for only 20 percent. Jorgenson and Khuong Vu (2005) established similar results for the world economy.

New architecture for the national accounts. Jorgenson and Steven Landefeld, director of the U.S. Bureau of Economic Analysis, have proposed a new system of national accounts that incorporates the cost of capital for all assets, including information technology equipment and software. The new system is presented in their book with William Nordhaus, published in 2006. In March 2007 Jorgenson's cost of capital was recommended by the United Nations Statistical Commission for incorporation into the United Nations’ 2008 System of National Accounts. Paul Schreyer (2009) has published an OECD Manual, Measuring Capital, to serve as a guide to practitioners. The “new architecture” was endorsed by the Advisory Committee on Measuring Innovation in the 21st Century to the Secretary of Commerce in 2008. Jorgenson (2009) has presented an updated version of the “new architecture” in his Richard and Nancy Ruggles Memorial Lecture to the International Association for Research in Income and Wealth.

The World KLEMS Initiative was established at Harvard University on August 19–20, 2010. This will ultimately include industry-level production accounts, incorporating capital (K), labor (L), energy (E), materials (M) and services (S) inputs, for more than forty countries. Accounts for 25 or the 27 EU members, assembled by 18 EU-based research teams, were completed on June 30, 2008, and are presented by Marcel P. Timmer, Robert Inklaar, Mary O’Mahony, and Bart van Ark (2010). This landmark study also provides industry-level accounts for Australia, Canada, Japan, and Korea, as well as the U.S., based on the methodology of Jorgenson, Ho, and Stiroh (2005). These industry-level production accounts are now included in the official national accounts for Australia, Canada, and five European countries. The World KLEMS initiative will extend these efforts to important emerging and transition economies, including Argentina, Brazil, Chile, China, India, Indonesia, Mexico, Russia, Turkey, and Taiwan.

Welfare measurement. In 1990 Jorgenson presented econometric methods for welfare measurement in his Presidential Address to the Econometric Society. These methods have generated a new approach to cost of living measurement and new measures of the standard of living, inequality, and poverty. This has required dispensing with ordinal measures of individual welfare that are not comparable among individuals, as persuasively argued by Amartya Sen in 1977. Jorgenson and Daniel T. Slesnick have met this requirement by substituting cardinal measures of individual welfare that are fully comparable among individuals. In 1989 Arthur Lewbel showed how the household equivalence scales proposed by Jorgenson and Slesnick can be used for this purpose.

Evaluation of alternative policies. In 1993 Jorgenson and Peter J. Wilcoxen surveyed this evaluation of energy, environmental, trade, and tax policies, based on the econometric general equilibrium models Jorgenson developed with Ho and Wilcoxen. The concept of an intertemporal price system provides the unifying framework. This system balances current demands and supplies for products and factors of production. Asset prices are linked to the present values of future capital services through rational expectations equilibrium. The long-run dynamics of economic growth are captured through linkages among capital services, capital stocks, and past investments. Alternative policies are compared in terms of the impact of changes in policy on individual and social welfare. This approach was incorporated into the official guidelines for preparing economic analyses by the U.S. Environmental Protection Agency in 2000.

Death 
Jorgenson died on June 8, 2022, at a hospital in Cambridge, Massachusetts. He was suffering from respiratory ailments.

Notes

External links
 Harvard biography
 Senate article
 SAST REPORT: a candid conversation with economist Dale W. Jorgenson about his tax reform proposal

1933 births
2022 deaths
Writers from Bozeman, Montana
Mathematicians from Montana
Reed College alumni
Harvard University alumni
Kansai University alumni
Fellows of the American Statistical Association
Fellows of the Econometric Society
Presidents of the Econometric Society
Harvard University faculty
Harvard Kennedy School faculty
Members of the Royal Swedish Academy of Sciences
Members of the United States National Academy of Sciences
Fellows of the American Academy of Arts and Sciences
Presidents of the American Economic Association
20th-century American economists
21st-century American economists
Distinguished Fellows of the American Economic Association
Economists from Montana
Members of the American Philosophical Society